"The Days of the Phoenix" is a song by the American rock band AFI. It was released to radio as the only single from their fifth studio album The Art of Drowning in 2000.

Background
According to Alternative Press, AFI "used to play at a venue in Petaluma, California, called the Phoenix Theater, and the track serves as a nod to their roots and early beginnings as a band."

Music video
A music video directed by Marc Webb was shot in 14 Below, a music venue located in Santa Monica, California.

It features the band performing on stage in front of an excited audience. During the song's bridge, multiple versions of vocalist Davey Havok are seen quoting the bridge's lyrics, one by one.

Track listing

Personnel 
Credits adapted from liner notes.

 AFI – producer
 Chuck Johnson – producer
 Andy Ernst – mixing
 Jerry Finn – remix

The Days of the Phoenix E.P. 

An EP for the single was released on May 14, 2001, through Nitro Records. In addition to the title track, it contains "Wester" from The Art of Drowning, as well "A Winter's Tale", a b-side recorded during that album's sessions. Only 500 copies of the EP were pressed.

Track listing

Personnel 
Credits adapted from liner notes.

 AFI – producer
 Michael Anderson – assistant engineer
 Adam Carson – drums
 Andy Ernst – mixing
 Alan Forbes – artwork
 Davey Havok – vocals
 Hunter Burgan – bass
 Chuck Johnson – producer, engineer
 Thad LaRue – mixing assistant
 Chris Nitro – layout
 Jade Puget – guitar
Nick 13 – guitar

 Frank Rinella – assistant engineer
 Eddy Schreyer – mastering

Studios
 Engineered at Fantasy Studios, Berkeley, CA
 Mixed at The Art of Ears, Hayward, CA
 Mastered at Oasis Mastering, Studio City, CA

Charts

References 

2000 singles
AFI (band) songs
Music videos directed by Marc Webb
2000 songs
Songs written by Hunter Burgan
Songs written by Adam Carson
Songs written by Davey Havok
Songs written by Jade Puget